Bahawal Victoria Hospital (abbreviated as BVH) is a hospital located in Bahawalpur, Pakistan.

History 
Bahawalpur is home to numerous medical facilities, including hospitals and clinics. Nonetheless, Bahawal Victoria Hospital is a significant player in this field. Providing medical services in various settings plays an essential role in the health care system. As a result, patients come to this hospital from around Bahawalpur Division, not just the neighbourhood around the hospital for more reading Bahawalpur.org.

It started as a Civil Hospital with an outdoor department, a dispensary, and an operating theatre in 1876. In 1906, this health unit was named Bahawal Victoria Hospital. Now, it is a hub of clinical expertise both in specialties as well as in sub-specialties with a multitude of patients visiting the hospital. In 1952, a benevolent extension of Nursing School was brought about with an anticipation to render rash and prompt basic health amenities. Classes leading to L.S.M.F were also started in 1956. Its nexus with Quaid e Azam Medical College (QAMC) in 1970 has transformed it into one of the largest tertiary care facilities in the province of Punjab.

The excellent medical staff is one of the best things about Bahawal Victoria Hospital. It does, however, make it possible for people to get help for any medical issue they face. A patient has the option of consulting either a male or female doctor.

It is now a 2200-bed, fully equipped, tertiary-care hospital with all medical and surgical specialities, serving large number of patients in south Punjab. It facilitates undergraduate medical students of Quaid-e-Azam Medical College, nursing students of allied nursing school, paramedics and many post-graduate trainees.

Units and departments 

 Department of Medicine (consists of four wards/units)
 Department of Surgery (consists of four wards/units)
 Department of Obstetrics and Gynaecology (consists of two wards/units)
 Department of Paediatrics (consists of two wards/units)
 Department of Allied Medicine
 Cardiology/CCU unit
 Nephrology/Dialysis unit
 Pulmonology/Chest Diseases unit
 Dermatology unit
 Psychiatry/Behavioural Sciences unit
 Department of Allied Surgery (consists of two units of each of 
 Otolaryngology (two units)
 Ophthalmology (two units)
 Plastic/Reconstructive Surgery
 Orthopedic Surgery
 Urology
 Neurosurgery
 Accidents and Emergency Department
 Paediatric Surgery
 Department of Radiology and Medical Imaging
 Department of Pathology/Medical Laboratory Sciences 
 Histopathology section
 Haematology section
 Microbiology section
 Chemical Pathology section
 Molecular Biology/PCR section
 Endocrinology section
 Department of Physiotherapy
 Department of Public Health/Community Medicine

References 

Hospitals in Punjab, Pakistan
1876 establishments in British India
Buildings and structures in Bahawalpur
Hospitals established in 1876